Yseult may refer to:

Places
Yseult Island, a small rocky island east of Tristan Island and north of the east point on Cape Jules

Persons
Iseult, alternatively Yseult amongst others, name of several characters in the Arthurian story of Tristan and Iseult
Yseult (singer), (born 1994) French singer
Yseult Gervy (born 1979), Belgian swimmer
Sean Yseult (born 1966), American rock musician